Making Believe is a compilation album by Conway Twitty and Loretta Lynn. It was released on September 5, 1988, by MCA Records. It was the last album release to feature new material by the duo. The album is made up of five previously unreleased songs and five songs from previous albums.

Critical reception
Billboard published a review in the September 17, 1988 issue which said, "A bright—if patchwork—project, this offers one side of new recordings of old standards and another of previously released duet material, some of which dates back to 1973."

Commercial performance 
The album peaked at No. 62 on the US Billboard Hot Country Albums chart, becoming the duo's lowest position on the chart.

The album's only single, "Making Believe", was released in September 1988 and is the duo's only single to not appear on any music charts.

Track listing

Charts

References 

1988 albums
Loretta Lynn albums
Conway Twitty albums
MCA Records albums
albums produced by Jimmy Bowen
albums produced by Owen Bradley